Spill At Will is the fourth studio album by American rapper Paradime, released on July 17, 2007 via Beats At Will Records. It featured guest appearances by the likes of Guilty Simpson, Trick-Trick, Marv Won, Cadillac Dale, King Jazzy, and Kenny Tudrick.

The album's cover art and title served as a tribute to Ice Cube's Kill At Will EP.

Originally scheduled as an extended play, Spill At Will became a full-length album during its creation. It is also a prequel to his upcoming fifth LP titled The Slow But Inevitable Maturation of Freddie, which supposed to be released in fall 2010.

Dime won Detroit Music Award in category Outstanding National Small/Independent Label Recording.

Track listing

Personnel 
 Byron Simpson – guest artist
 Chris Mathis – guest artist, producer
 Daniel Carlisle – producer
 Fred Beauregard – main artist, producer
 Kenny Tudrick – guest artist, producer
 Marvin O'Neil – guest artist
 Stefanie Eulinberg – additional vocals (track 3)

References 

2007 albums
Paradime albums